{{Infobox football club
| clubname = Al-Ittihad of Aleppo
| image    = Al Ittihad Aleppo.gif
| fullname = Al-Ittihad Sports Club of Aleppo
| founded  =  as Al-Ahli Sports Club
| nickname = The Red CastleHalab Al-AhliAl-Hawiya
| ground   = Al-Hamadaniah Stadium 
| capacity = 15,000
| chrtitle = President
| chairman =  Rasen Martini
| manager =  Maher Bahri
| league   = Syrian Premier League
| season   = 2021–22
| position = 5th 
|pattern_la1=_blackline
|pattern_b1 =_shoulder_stripes_black_stripes
|pattern_ra1=_blackline
|leftarm1   =FF0000
|body1      =FF0000
|rightarm1  =FF0000
|shorts1    =FF0000
|socks1     =FF0000
|pattern_la2=_redlines
|pattern_b2 =_whiteredstriped_sides
|pattern_ra2=_redlines
|pattern_sh2=_red_stripes_adidas
|leftarm2   =FFFFFF
|body2      =FFFFFF
|shorts2    =_red_stripes_adidas
|socks2     =FFFFFF
|pattern_la3=_red_stripes
|pattern_b3 =_red_stripes
|pattern_ra3=_red_stripes
|pattern_sh3=_red_stripes
|pattern_so3 =_band_red
|leftarm3   =FFFFFF
|body3      =FFFFFF
|shorts3    =_red_stripes_adidas
|socks3     =FFFFFF
|website =https://www.facebook.com/ittihadofaleppo/ Official page
| current = 2022–23 Syrian Premier League
}}

Al-Ittihad Sports Club of Aleppo is a professional multi-sports club based in the Syrian city of Aleppo, mostly known for its football team which competes in the Syrian Premier League, the top league of Syrian football. Being one of the most successful clubs (after Al-Jaish, Al-Karamah SC) in Syrian football history, Al-Ittihad won six Syrian football league titles and ten Syrian cups. Al-Ittihad is a sole founding member of Syrian Premier League that has never been relegated from the top division since its debut in 1966. In Asia, their best performance was in 2010 when they became champions of AFC Cup competition.

The club was founded in 1949 and received its license in 1953. They play their home games at the Aleppo International Stadium since its inauguration in 2007. Due to the reconstruction of the main Aleppo International Stadium, they are temporarily playing at the Al-Hamadaniah Stadium from 2021. The club have their own ground; Al-Ittihad Stadium with a capacity of 10,000 spectators.

Al-Ittihad are also known for their basketball team. In general, 20 types of sports including volleyball and handball are being practiced by the club.

History
 Early history (1949–1972) 
The club was founded on 20 January 1949 under the name Halab Al-Ahli Club, by the merge of three smaller football teams in Aleppo: Al-Janah (The Wing), Assad Al-Shahba (Lions of Shahba) and Al-Nejmeh (The Star), before getting recognized officially by the Ministry of Internal Affairs on 24 September 1953. Prior to the foundation of the Syrian official football league, the club have competed in various regional competitions in the Aleppo Governorate such as the regional league of Aleppo and the Aleppo Municipality Shield. The first major success in the club's history was winning the Syrian Cup in the 1964–65 season, when they beat Barada SC 4–1 in the final.

The club have participated in the first ever Syrian football league in 1966–67 when they became champions. In the following league season, the club managed to defend the title. In 1972, the name of the club was changed to Al-Ittihad SC Aleppo by the decision of the Syrian government. Since then, they have never relegated to the bottom level.

 Ups and downs (1972–2005) 
The 1972–73 season was also success, as despite the league being suspended, the club managed to win the Syrian Cup. Despite being among the most successful clubs in the country, they only managed to win the league title in the 1976–77 season when they overtook their later rivals Al-Karamah SC. Until 1982, Al-Ahli regularly placed third in the league.

Everything changed in the 1981–82 season when Al-Ahli won the Syrian Cup and reached the final of the Syrian Super Cup, losing 1–2 to Al-Karamah SC. The same success in the cup was recorded by the club in 1984 and 1985. In the 1985–86 season, the club made its first appearance in an Asian competition, advancing from the group stage at the Asian Club Championship and finishing in 4th place after losing to Krama Yudha Tiga Berlian. In the following seasons, the club managed to finish second at most.

The last time in this period, the club managed to achieve the league championship in 1993 and 1995, beating long standing rival Al-Karamah. In addition to both league titles, they also won the Cup in 1994 over Jableh SC. After this seasons, the club experienced a loss of quality, which was reflected in the club's poor results in domestic competitions.

 Domestic and continental success (2005–2012) 
In the 2004–05 season, after a successful group stage of the league, the club took part in the title, and then, after winning the cup final over Al-Majd SC, also the Syrian Cup victory. In the 2005–2006 season, Al-Ahli managed to win the Syrian Cup after they dominated the final against Tishreen SC 3–0. For the first time in their history, they took part in the AFC Champions League, where they took third place in the group after defeating Pakhtakor and Foolad. In the 2007–08 season, the club finished third overall in the league behind Al Karamah and Al Majd SC. The club also participated in the 2008 AFC Champions League, defeating Sepahan twice in the group stage (2–1, 2–0). In April 2009, after two years, the club sacked its Romanian coach Valeriu Tița. During the 2009/10 winter break, Tița returned to Al-Ittihad, bringing with him goalkeeping coach Dan Racolța.

In the 2010 season, during its first participation in the AFC Cup, Al-Ittihad was able to go from second place in the group to the playoffs. In the round of 16 of the competition, they met Kuwait SC, which they defeated 5–4 on penalties after a 1–1 draw in regular time. In the quarter-finals, they advanced over Kazma SC, which they defeated 3–2 and 1–0. In the semi-finals, they beat Muangthong United 2–1 on the score after a close double-header. In the final of the AFC Cup, they met with Qadsia SC, with whom they drew 1–1 after regular time (Dyab scored a goal for Ittihad) and beat them 4–2 after penalties (Radwan Kalaji scored the decisive penalty). They became only the second Syrian football club to win the Asian club competition.

In the 2010–11 season, the club won the Syrian Cup, defeating Al-Wathba SC 3–1 in the final. In the same season, the club failed to reach the AFC Champions League play-offs, losing to Al Sadd SC 1–5. In the group stage of the 2011 AFC Cup, they first beat Al-Saqr 2–1, but then lost to Qadsia SC 0–2. In other matches, they drew Shurtan Guzar 1–1 and 0–0, won against Al-Saqr SC 2–0 and lost to Qadsia 2–3.

In the 2011–12 season, the club was playing to stay in the Syrian Premier League and withdrew from the 2012 Syrian Cup in the semi-finals due to the conflict in the country. The club also participated in the 2012 AFC Cup, despite not being able to play at home ground, they beat Qadsia 1–0 and drew with Al-Faisaly SC 0–0.

 Difficult years (2012–2017) 

The club had to play the entire 2012–13 season in Damascus due to security reasons arising from the beginning of the Battle of Aleppo. Despite this, it placed in mid-table in the league and retained its league affiliation. Due to the security situation, Al-Ittihad also had to withdraw from the 2013 Syrian Cup, for which it was threatened with a two-year ban from participating in domestic competitions, but it finally received an exemption from the federation. 

In the 2013–14 season, the club also played in Damascus and finished in the relegation place in the league, it was saved from relegation by the fact that the clubs in the first division were not interested in entering the SPL. The club achieved little success in the 2014 Syrian Cup, where they advanced to the semi-finals, where they lost to Baniyas SC 0–2. In the 2014–15 season, the club was placed in the bottom half of the league table of Group A.

In the 2015–16 season, Al-Ittihad SC achieved unexpected success by finishing second in Group B of the SPL, advancing to the Championship group where they finished just three points behind Al-Wahda and Al-Jaish in third place. The 2016–17 season was a breakthrough from the club's point of view. On 28 January 2017, Al-Ahli finally returned to Aleppo, defeating Hurriya SC 2–1 in a derby match at Ri'ayet al-Shabab Stadium.

 Stabilization and gradual success (2017–present) 
Financially and infrastructurally stabilized Al-Ittihad finished in second place in the 2017–18 season, after losing a tie-breaker to Al-Jaish with whom they were level on points. They lost to Al-Jaish 0–1 as league vice-champions in the 2018 Syrian Super Cup.

In the 2018–19 season, they participated as Syrian runners-up in the group stage of the 2019 AFC Cup. Unfortunately, the team managed only one positive result, a 0–0 draw with Al-Najma. They lost the other matches with Al-Jazeera SC and Kuwait SC.

In the 2019–20 and 2020–21 seasons, the Al-Ittihad finished sixth and eighth respectively in the Syrian Premier League. Therefore, due to the negative results, the club management gradually dismissed the coaches Ahmad Hawash and Artur Bernardes. A new Croatian coach, Igor Tkalčević, came in their place, but the results of the football team did not improve, as they were only playing for survival in the league until the spring of 2022.

The situation culminated in the resignation of the long-time chairman of the club Bassel Hamwi in March 2022, who was replaced by the new chairman Rasen Martini and the new coach Maher Bahri. The team, stabilized financially and in play, ended up in fifth place in the SPL. In the same 2021–22 season, Al-Ahli achieved historic success, after defeating Al-Hurriya and Al-Jaish, the team reached the final of the Syrian Cup, beating Al-Wathba SC 4–3 on penalties.

Stadiums

Al-Ittihad's original home ground since the early 1950s was the Aleppo Municipal Stadium which is considered one of the most historic stadiums in Syria. At the beginning of the 1990s the club moved to the newly built Al-Hamadaniah Stadium. After the inauguration of the Aleppo International Stadium in 2007, the club decided to play their home games at the Syrian league and AFC competitions in the modern stadium which can host around 53,000 spectators. Al-Hamadaniah Stadium is still used as an alternative venue.

Training facilities

The training grounds of al-Ittihad are located in the al-Shahbaa district of Aleppo. The complex is home to the Al-Ittihad Stadium with a capacity of 10,000 spectators, a nearby indoor training pitch and many other small pitches. There are also two basketball courts, an outdoor swimming pool, a restaurant, conference rooms and offices.

Supporters and rivalries
Al-Ittihad are rivals with fellow Aleppine clubs Hurriya, Al-Jalaa, Al-Herafyeen, Ouroube and Al-Yarmouk. In addition to the city's rivals, the biggest rival are the Al-Wahda SC and Al-Karamah SC with whom the club plays the Syrian derby El Clásico. Their ultras group, formed before 2009, is called "Red Devils of Aleppo".

Colours and kits
Since its foundation, the traditional colour of Al-Ittihad's home kit is red with various designs over the years. Therefore, the club is nicknamed The Red Castle by the fans as a reference to the city's main landmark; the Citadel of Aleppo. The away kit may vary between a full white kit and a white kit with red stripes on the shirt. The Olympic rings were added underneath to signify Al-Ittihad's status as a multi-sport club.

Kit suppliers and shirt sponsors

Football achievements
Domestic
 Syrian Premier League: 6
Winners: 1967, 1968, 1977, 1993, 1995, 2005
 Syrian Cup: 10
Winners: 1965, 1973, 1982, 1984, 1985, 1994, 2005, 2006, 2011, 2022
 Syrian Super Cup:
Runners-up: 1982, 1985, 2018

Continental
AFC Cup: 1
Winners: 2010

Regional
 Arab Champions Cup:
Round of 16: 2009

Performance in AFC competitions

 Asian Club Championship: 1 appearance
1985: 4th place

 AFC Champions League: 5 appearances
2002–03: Qualifying West – 3rd Round
2006: Group Stage
2007: Group Stage
2008: Group Stage
2011: Qualifying Play-off – West Semi-final

 AFC Cup: 4 appearances
2010: Champions
2011: Group Stage
2012: Group Stage
2019: Group Stage

RecordsAccurate as of 12 June 2022Performance in UAFA competitions
 Arab Champions Cup: 2 appearances
2004: 1st Round 
2009: Round of 16
 Arab Cup Winners' Cup: 1 appearance
1995: Group Stage

RecordsAccurate as of 12 June 2022''

Players

Current squad

Notable players

Former notable players

Administration
Administrative Board of Al-Ittihad Aleppo Club:

{| class="wikitable"
|-
! style="color:white; background:red;"| Office
! style="color:white; background:red;"| Name
|-
|President of the Board
|Rasen Martini
|-
|Investment and Facilities Director
|Mulham Tabbara
|-
|Member of the Board 
|Jum'a ar-Rashed
|-
|Administrative and Legislative Committee Director 
|Ayman Hazzam
|-
|Financial Director 
|Ziyad al-Sheikh Omar
|-
|Member of the Board 
|Weizar Sarmini
|-
|Training Centres Director
|Reem Sabbagh
|-

Managerial history

  Abdel Qader Tayfur (1965–67)
  Zaki Natoor (1967–77)
  Mahmoud Sultan (1981–84)
  Wael Aqqad (1990)
  Nael Burghol (1990–92)
  Ahmad Hawash (1992–93)
  Fateh Zaki (1994–95)
  Jiří Nevrlý (1999–01) 
  Osvaldo Ardiles (2001)
  Stefan Genov (2001–02)
  Hassan El-Shazly (2002–03)
  Amin Alati (2003)
  Mahmoud Abou-Regaila (Feb 2004 – July 2004)
  Yasser Sibai (2004–05)
  Ahmad Hawash (2005–06)
  Hussain Afash (2006–07)
  Oscar Fulloné (July 2007 – January 2008)
  Valeriu Tiţa (Feb 2008 – April 2009) 
  Hussain Afash (April 2009 – July 2009)
  José Rachão (August 2009 – November 2009)
  Mohammad Khattam (Nov 2009)
  Fateh Zaki (November 2009 – February 2010) 
  Valeriu Tiţa (February 2010 – December 2010) 
  Kemal Alispahić (January 2011 – June 2011)
  Amin Alati (November 2011 – December 2011)
  Hussain Afash (January 2012 – April 2012)
  Ammar Rihawi (2013)
  Anas Sabouni (January 2014 – March 2014)
  Radwan al-Abrash (March 2014 – September 2014)
  Kais Yâakoubi (August 2019 – February 2020)
  Ahmad Hawash (February 2020 – February 2021)
  Arthur Bernardes (February 2021 – May 2021)
  Igor Tkalčević (July 2021 – March 2022)
  Maher Bahri (March 2022 – present)

Notes

References

External links
   Al Ittihad Fans society website 

Ittihad
Association football clubs established in 1949
Sport in Aleppo
1949 establishments in Syria
AFC Cup winning clubs